Following is a list of dams and reservoirs in Indiana.

All major dams are linked below.

Dams and reservoirs in Indiana

This list is incomplete.  You can help Wikipedia by expanding it.

 Brookville Lake Dam, Brookville Lake, United States Army Corps of Engineers (USACE)
 Cagles Mill Dam, Cagles Mill Lake, USACE
 Cannelton Locks and Dam, Ohio River, USACE (between Indiana and Kentucky)
 Cecil M. Harden Lake Dam, Cecil M. Harden Lake, USACE
 Citizens Reservoir, Citizens Energy Group
 Eagle Creek Reservoir Dam, Eagle Creek Reservoir, City of Indianapolis Department of Public Works
 Geist Reservoir Dam, Geist Reservoir, Citizens Energy Group
 multiple dams, Gibson Lake, Duke Energy
 Glendale Reservoir, Dogwood Lake, Indiana Department of Natural Resources
 Grand Rapids Dam, unnamed reservoir of the Wabash River, USACE (abandoned)
 J. Edward Roush Lake Dam, J. Edward Roush Lake, USACE
 John T. Myers Locks and Dam, Ohio River, USACE (between Indiana and Kentucky)
 Lake Lemon Dam, Lake Lemon, City of Bloomington, Indiana
 Lake Wawasee, City of Warsaw, Indiana
 Markland Locks and Dam, Ohio River, USACE (between Indiana and Kentucky)
 McAlpine Locks and Dam, Ohio River, USACE (between Indiana and Kentucky)
 Middle Fork No. 4 Dam, Tipsaw Lake, United States Forest Service
 Mississinewa Lake Dam, Mississinewa Lake, USACE
 Monroe Lake Dam, Lake Monroe, USACE
 Morse Reservoir Dam, Morse Reservoir, Citizens Energy Group
 Newburgh Lock and Dam, Ohio River, USACE (between Indiana and Kentucky)
 Oakdale Dam, Lake Freeman, Northern Indiana Public Service Co.
 Patoka Dam, Patoka Lake, USACE
 Quick Creek Dam, Hardy Lake, State of Indiana
 Salamonie Lake Dam, Salamonie Lake, USACE

References 

 
 
Indiana
Dams
Dams